Yampa is a statutory town in Routt County, Colorado, United States. The population was 429 at the 2010 census.

City name
 is the Northern Ute word for the Perideridia root, which was an important food source.

Geography
Yampa is at  (40.153250, -106.908437).

Climate
Yampa has a humid continental climate (Köppen climate classification Dfb), with warm summers and long, cold, snowy winters. Due to altitude and dryness, the diurnal temperature variation is large throughout the year, especially in summer, and the growing season is short, typically averaging just 80 days.

Demographics

As of the census of 2000, there were 443 people, 187 households, and 121 families residing in the town. The racial makeup of the town was 96.39% White, 0.23% African American, 1.13% Native American, 0.23% Pacific Islander, 0.90% from other races, and 1.13% from two or more races. Hispanic or Latino of any race were 4.51% of the population.

There were 187 households, out of which 35.3% had children under the age of 18 living with them, 55.1% were married couples living together, 5.3% had a female householder with no husband present, and 34.8% were non-families. 29.4% of all households were made up of individuals, and 5.9% had someone living alone who was 65 years of age or older. The average household size was 2.37 and the average family size was 2.94.

In the town, the population was spread out, with 26.4% under the age of 18, 6.8% from 18 to 24, 28.7% from 25 to 44, 30.5% from 45 to 64, and 7.7% who were 65 years of age or older. The median age was 38 years. For every 100 females, there were 118.2 males. For every 100 females age 18 and over, there were 118.8 males.

The median income for a household in the town was $37,500, and the median income for a family was $45,000. Males had a median income of $37,000 versus $20,625 for females. The per capita income for the town was $21,141. About 5.7% of families and 8.4% of the population were below the poverty line, including 7.6% of those under age 18 and 10.3% of those age 65 or over.

See also

 List of municipalities in Colorado

References

External links

 Town of Yampa contacts
 CDOT map of the Town of Yampa

Towns in Routt County, Colorado
Towns in Colorado